North Crossett is a census-designated place (CDP) in Ashley County, Arkansas, United States. Per the 2020 census, the population was 2,756.

Geography
North Crossett is located at  (33.167512, -91.942671).

Demographics

2020 census

Note: the US Census treats Hispanic/Latino as an ethnic category. This table excludes Latinos from the racial categories and assigns them to a separate category. Hispanics/Latinos can be of any race.

2000 Census
As of the census of 2000, there were 3,581 people, 1,422 households, and 1,045 families residing in the CDP. The racial makeup of the CDP was 87.69% White, 10.42% Black or African American, 0.25% Native American, 0.20% Asian, 0.14% Pacific Islander, 0.73% from other races, and 0.59% from two or more races.  2.04% of the population were Hispanic or Latino of any race.

There were 1,422 households, out of which 35.2% had children under the age of 18 living with them, 57.4% were married couples living together, 12.2% had a female householder with no husband present, and 26.5% were non-families. 23.5% of all households were made up of individuals, and 8.9% had someone living alone who was 65 years of age or older.  The average household size was 2.52 and the average family size was 2.96.

In the CDP, the population was spread out, with 27.6% under the age of 18, 8.8% from 18 to 24, 29.6% from 25 to 44, 23.1% from 45 to 64, and 11.0% who were 65 years of age or older.  The median age was 33 years. For every 100 females, there were 93.8 males.  For every 100 females age 18 and over, there were 88.5 males.

The median income for a household in the CDP was $29,734, and the median income for a family was $35,682. Males had a median income of $34,146 versus $17,927 for females. The per capita income for the CDP was $14,945.  About 14.1% of families and 18.6% of the population were below the poverty line, including 31.9% of those under age 18 and 21.0% of those age 65 or over.

Education
Most of the North Crossett CDP is in the Crossett School District which operates Crossett High School. A portion is in the Hamburg School District, which operates Hamburg High School.

References

Census-designated places in Ashley County, Arkansas
Census-designated places in Arkansas